Harold Edward Bindloss (6 April 186630 December 1945) was an English novelist who wrote many adventure novels set in western Canada and some West Africa and England. His writing was strongly based on his own experience, whether as a seaman, a dock worker, a farmer or a planter.

Biography
Bindloss was born in on 6 April  1866 in Wavertree, Liverpool, England. the eldest son of Edward Williams Bindloss (born c. 1838), an iron merchant with six men in his employ at the time of the 1881 census. Bindloss had three sisters and four brothers. He spent several years at sea and in various colonies, especially in Africa, before returning to England in 1896, his health broken by malaria. Bindloss was absent from the family home in 1881, but the 1891 census found him living at home and serving as an iron-merchant's clerk, presumably for his father.

He apparently began work as a clerk in a shipping office but this did not suit his adventurous spirit, and he was at various times a farmer in Canada, a sailor, a dock worker and a planter. He returned to England in 1896, presumably from West Africa, as he returned sick of malaria. Given that he spent more than a decade at sea and in the colonies, it seems likely that his experience abroad was in two parts, first as a youth, and than as a young man, after 1891.

After returning home in 1896 he began working as a journalist, and then wrote two non-fiction books based on his travels, the first, In the Niger Country (1898, Blackwood & Sons, Edinburgh) about West Africa, and the second, A Wide Dominion (1899, T. Fisher Unwin, London) about Canada. His first novel was Ainslie's Ju-Ju, set in West Africa which Truth described as "a book that has the double interest and excitement of a story and of a genuine record of travel and adventure mixed together judiciously." This was the first of nearly one hundred novels by Bindloss. The next A Sower of Wheat (1901, Chatto and Windus, London) was set in Canada. This set the pattern for Bindloss, as most of his novels were set in Canada or West Africa. The Guardian refers to him as having two strings to his bow, stories set in Canada or West Africa, with the Canadian stories being remarkably superior.

Bindloss married Mary Simpson Hossack (11 Mar 18692 November 1945) the youngest daughter of Captain Joseph Hossack, a marine surveyor, at St James Church in West Derby, Lancaster, on 12 June 1899. The couple appear not to have had any children as the 1911 census records them as not having had any after twelve years of marriage.

Bindloss was a prolific author. The most common obituary estimate is that he wrote over 40 novels. ABC Bookworld lists 62 books by Bindloss. Kemp states that he wrote two to three books a year in the early 1900s. The Belfast Newsletter states that he published 67 books. However, Jisc Library Hub Discover lists 89 books by Bindloss, the first two being non-fiction and the rest novels.

He is remembered in the name of the town Bindloss, Alberta, Canada, established by the Canadian Pacific Railroad in 1914.

Bindloss died on 30 December 1945 at Chertsey Hill Nursing Home in Carlisle, England. He had been living at Vallum, Burgh-by-Sands in Cumbria. His estate was valued at £24,774 0s. 9d. His wife had died at home on 2 November 1945, and he was granted probate, as her executor just a fortnight before he died.

Works

Assessment
Bindloss was a popular author. Some of his works such as, Alton of Somasco, Alison's Adventure, Delilah of the Snows and Thrice Armed were reprinted numerous times on both sides of the Atlantic. One reviewer writes: "A new book by Harold Bindloss is always welcome. He tells a story well indeed, but one likes his books best perhaps for the environment which he knows so well how to sketch. He has written charming stories of the Canadian Northwest and one remembers with pleasure his novels Prescott of Saskatchewan and Winston of the Prairie."

One strong feature of Bindlosss's work was that he wrote from his own experience, either of the sea, of Canada, or West Africa. The Buffalo Courier notes that "His descriptions are not those of the land-lubber who writes from a safe-point of vantage... He writes from a varied and wide experience of the charm the sea exerts over those, who once set forth upon its trackless waste."

The Oakland Tribune also wrote: "It has become so that a new book by Bindloss is warmly greeted, for while it Is like greeting an old friend, in a way, there is certain to be new characters and new manner of bringing a quickening of the blood and a tendency to hold the breath. Bindloss, besides writing of the sort of men and women that most of the world knows earns blessings by not making then transcend the improbable either in thought or deed. More briefly, they are human beings with greater opportunity for excitement that falls to the lot of most."

Harrison stated that "Bindloss was probably a more capable craftsman than any native Canadian writer of the period" and that "he had spent enough time in the West to make his settings authentic with real observed details."

Notes

References

External links

 
 
 
 
 Harold Bindloss bibliography
 Harold Bindloss, The Online Books Page, University of Pennsylvania
 Satellite image of Bindloss, Alberta on Google Maps

1866 births
1945 deaths
20th-century English novelists
English writers
People from Liverpool